Pramana (Sanskrit: प्रमाण) literally means "proof" and "means of knowledge". In Indian philosophies, pramana are the means which can lead to knowledge, and serve as one of the core concepts in Indian epistemology. It has been one of the key, much debated fields of study in Hinduism, Buddhism and Jainism since ancient times. It is a theory of knowledge, and encompasses one or more reliable and valid means by which human beings gain accurate, true knowledge. The focus of pramana is how correct knowledge can be acquired, how one knows, how one does not know, and to what extent knowledge pertinent about someone or something can be acquired.

While the number of pramanas varies widely from system to system, many ancient and medieval Indian texts identify six pramanas as correct means of accurate knowledge and to truths: Three central pramanas which are almost universally accepted, which are perception (Sanskrit pratyakṣa), inference (anumāna), and "word", meaning the testimony of past or present reliable experts (Śabda); and more contentious ones, which are comparison and analogy (upamāna),  postulation, derivation from circumstances (arthāpatti), and non-perception, negative/cognitive proof (anupalabdhi). Each of these are further categorized in terms of conditionality, completeness, confidence and possibility of error, by each school of Indian philosophies.

The various schools of Indian philosophies vary on how many of these six are epistemically reliable and valid means to knowledge. For example, the Carvaka school of the Śramaṇa tradition holds that only one (perception) is a reliable source of knowledge, Buddhism holds two (perception, inference) are valid means, Jainism holds three (perception, inference and testimony), while Mimamsa and Advaita Vedanta schools of Hinduism hold all six are useful and can be reliable means to knowledge. The various schools of Indian philosophy have debated whether one of the six forms of pramana can be derived from other, and the relative uniqueness of each. For example, Buddhism considers Buddha and other "valid persons", "valid scriptures" and "valid minds" as indisputable, but that such testimony is a form of perception and inference pramanas.

The science and study of pramanas is called Nyaya.

Etymology
Pramāṇa literally means "proof" and is also a concept and field of Indian philosophy. The concept is derived from the Sanskrit roots, pra (प्र), a preposition meaning "outward" or "forth", and mā (मा) which means "measurement". Pramā means "correct notion, true knowledge, basis, foundation, understand", with pramāṇa being a further nominalization of the word. Thus, the concept Pramāṇa implies that which is a "means of acquiring prama or certain, correct, true knowledge".

Pramāṇa forms one part of a trio of concepts, which describe the ancient Indian view on how knowledge is gained. The other two concepts are knower and knowable, each discussed in how they influence the knowledge, by their own characteristic and the process of knowing. The two are called Pramātŗ (प्रमातृ, the subject, the knower) and Prameya (प्रमेय, the object, the knowable).

The term Pramana is commonly found in various schools of Hinduism. In Buddhist literature, Pramana is referred to as Pramāṇavāda. Pramana is also related to the Indian concept of Yukti (युक्ति) which means active application of epistemology or what one already knows, innovation, clever expedients or connections, methodological or reasoning trick, joining together, application of contrivance, means, method, novelty or device to more efficiently achieve a purpose. Yukti and Pramana are discussed together in some Indian texts, with Yukti described as active process of gaining knowledge in contrast to passive process of gaining knowledge through observation/perception. The texts on Pramana, particularly by Samkhya, Yoga, Mimamsa and Advaita Vedanta schools of Hinduism, include in their meaning and scope "Theories of Errors", that is why human beings make error and reach incorrect knowledge, how can one know if one is wrong, and if so, how can one discover whether one's epistemic method was flawed, or one's conclusion (truth) was flawed, in order to revise oneself and reach correct knowledge.

Hinduism

Six pramanas
Hinduism identifies six pramanas as correct means of accurate knowledge and to truths: Pratyakṣa (perception), Anumāṇa (inference), Upamāṇa (comparison and analogy), Arthāpatti (postulation, derivation from circumstances), Anupalabdhi (non-perception, negative/cognitive proof) and Śabda (word, testimony of past or present reliable experts). 

In verse 1.2.1 of the Taittirīya Āraṇyaka (c. 9th–6th centuries BCE), "four means of attaining correct knowledge" are listed: smṛti ("scripture, tradition"), pratyakṣa ("perception"), aitihya ("expert testimony, historical tradition"), and anumāna ("inference").

In some texts such as by Vedvyasa, ten pramanas are discussed, Krtakoti discusses eight epistemically reliable means to correct knowledge. The most widely discussed pramanas are:

Pratyakṣa
Pratyakṣa (प्रत्यक्ष) means perception. It is of two types in Hindu texts: external and internal. External perception is described as that arising from the interaction of five senses and worldly objects, while internal perception is described by this school as that of inner sense, the mind. According to Matt Stefan, the distinction is between direct perception (anubhava) and remembered perception (smriti). 

The ancient and medieval Indian texts identify four requirements for correct perception: 
 Indriyarthasannikarsa (direct experience by one's sensory organ(s) with the object, whatever is being studied); 
 Avyapadesya (non-verbal; correct perception is not through hearsay, according to ancient Indian scholars, where one's sensory organ relies on accepting or rejecting someone else's perception); 
 Avyabhicara (does not wander; correct perception does not change, nor is it the result of deception because one's sensory organ or means of observation is drifting, defective, suspect); 
 Vyavasayatmaka (definite; correct perception excludes judgments of doubt, either because of one's failure to observe all the details, or because one is mixing inference with observation and observing what one wants to observe, or not observing what one does not want to observe). 

Some ancient scholars proposed "unusual perception" as pramana and called it internal perception, a proposal contested by other Indian scholars. The internal perception concepts included pratibha (intuition), samanyalaksanapratyaksa (a form of induction from perceived specifics to a universal), and jnanalaksanapratyaksa (a form of perception of prior processes and previous states of a 'topic of study' by observing its current state). Further, some schools of Hinduism considered and refined rules of accepting uncertain knowledge from Pratyakṣa-pranama, so as to contrast nirnaya (definite judgment, conclusion) from anadhyavasaya (indefinite judgment).

Anumāna
Anumāna (अनुमान) means ‘inference’ in Sanskrit, though it often is used to mean ‘guess’ in modern Indian languages like Hindi. In the context of classical philosophy, it is described as reaching a new conclusion and truth from one or more observations and previous truths by applying reason. Observing smoke and inferring fire is an example of Anumana. In all except one Hindu philosophies, this is a valid and useful means to knowledge. The method of inference is explained by Indian texts as consisting of three parts: pratijna (hypothesis), hetu (a reason), and drshtanta (examples). The hypothesis must further be broken down into two parts, state the ancient Indian scholars: sadhya (that idea which needs to proven or disproven) and paksha (the object on which the sadhya is predicated). The inference is conditionally true if sapaksha (positive examples as evidence) are present, and if vipaksha (negative examples as counter-evidence) are absent. For rigor, the Indian philosophies also state further epistemic steps. For example, they demand Vyapti - the requirement that the hetu (reason) must necessarily and separately account for the inference in "all" cases, in both sapaksha and vipaksha. A conditionally proven hypothesis is called a nigamana (conclusion).

Upamāna
Upamāna (उपमान) means comparison and analogy. Some Hindu schools consider it as a proper means of knowledge. Upamana, states Lochtefeld, may be explained with the example of a traveller who has never visited lands or islands with endemic population of wildlife. He or she is told, by someone who has been there, that in those lands you see an animal that sort of looks like a cow, grazes like cow but is different from a cow in such and such way. Such use of analogy and comparison is, state the Indian epistemologists, a valid means of conditional knowledge, as it helps the traveller identify the new animal later. The subject of comparison is formally called upameyam, the object of comparison is called upamanam, while the attribute(s) are identified as samanya. Thus, explains Monier Williams, if a boy says "her face is like the moon in charmingness", "her face" is upameyam, the moon is upamanam, and charmingness is samanya. The  7th century text Bhaṭṭikāvya in verses 10.28 through 10.63 discusses many types of comparisons and analogies, identifying when this epistemic method is more useful and reliable, and when it is not. In various ancient and medieval texts of Hinduism, 32 types of Upanama and their value in epistemology are debated.

Arthāpatti
Arthāpatti (अर्थापत्ति) means postulation, derivation from circumstances. In contemporary logic, this pramana is similar to circumstantial implication. As example, if a person left in a boat on river earlier, and the time is now past the expected time of arrival, then the circumstances support the truth postulate that the person has arrived. Many Indian scholars considered this pramana as invalid or at best weak, because the boat may have gotten delayed or diverted. However, in cases such as deriving the time of a future sunrise or sunset, this method was asserted by the proponents to be reliable. Another common example for arthapatti in ancient Hindu texts is, that if "Devadatta is fat" and "Devadatta does not eat in day", then the following must be true: "Devadatta eats in the night". This form of postulation and deriving from circumstances is, claim the Indian scholars, a means to discovery, proper insight and knowledge. The Hindu schools that accept this means of knowledge state that this method is a valid means to conditional knowledge and truths about a subject and object in original premises or different premises. The schools that do not accept this method, state that postulation, extrapolation and circumstantial implication is either derivable from other pramanas or flawed means to correct knowledge, instead one must rely on direct perception or proper inference.

Anupalabdi
Anupalabdi (अनुपलब्धि) means non-perception, negative/cognitive proof. Anupalabdhi pramana suggests that knowing a negative, such as "there is no jug in this room" is a form of valid knowledge. If something can be observed or inferred or proven as non-existent or impossible, then one knows more than what one did without such means. In the two schools of Hinduism that consider Anupalabdhi as epistemically valuable, a valid conclusion is either sadrupa (positive) or asadrupa (negative) relation — both correct and valuable. Like other pramana, Indian scholars refined Anupalabdi to four types: non-perception of the cause, non-perception of the effect, non-perception of object, and non-perception of contradiction. Only two schools of Hinduism accepted and developed the concept "non-perception" as a pramana. The schools that endorsed Anupalabdi affirmed that it as valid and useful when the other five pramanas fail in one's pursuit of knowledge and truth.

Abhava (अभाव) means non-existence. Some scholars consider Anupalabdi to be same as Abhava, while others consider Anupalabdi and Abhava as different. Abhava-pramana has been discussed in ancient Hindu texts in the context of Padārtha (पदार्थ, referent of a term). A Padartha is defined as that which is simultaneously Astitva (existent), Jneyatva (knowable) and Abhidheyatva (nameable). Specific examples of padartha, states Bartley, include dravya (substance), guna (quality), karma (activity/motion), samanya/jati (universal/class property), samavaya (inherence) and vishesha (individuality). Abhava is then explained as "referents of negative expression" in contrast to "referents of positive expression" in Padartha. An absence, state the ancient scholars, is also "existent, knowable and nameable", giving the example of negative numbers, silence as a form of testimony, asatkaryavada theory of causation, and analysis of deficit as real and valuable. Abhava was further refined in four types, by the schools of Hinduism that accepted it as a useful method of epistemology: dhvamsa (termination of what existed), atyanta-abhava (impossibility, absolute non-existence, contradiction), anyonya-abhava (mutual negation, reciprocal absence) and pragavasa (prior, antecedent non-existence).

Śabda

Śabda (शब्द) means relying on word, testimony of past or present reliable experts, specifically the shruti, Vedas. Hiriyanna explains Sabda-pramana as a concept which means reliable expert testimony. The schools of Hinduism which consider it epistemically valid suggest that a human being needs to know numerous facts, and with the limited time and energy available, he can learn only a fraction of those facts and truths directly.  He must rely on others, his parent, family, friends, teachers, ancestors and kindred members of society to rapidly acquire and share knowledge and thereby enrich each other's lives. This means of gaining proper knowledge is either spoken or written, but through Sabda (words). The reliability of the source is important, and legitimate knowledge can only come from the Sabda of reliable sources. The disagreement between the schools of Hinduism has been on how to establish reliability. Some schools, such as Carvaka, state that this is never possible, and therefore Sabda is not a proper pramana. Other schools debate means to establish reliability.

Acceptance per school
Different schools of Hindu philosophy accept one or more of these pramanas as valid epistemology.

Carvaka school
Carvaka school accepted only one valid source of knowledge - perception. It held all remaining methods as outright invalid or prone to error and therefore invalid.

Vaisheshika school
Epistemologically, the Vaiśeṣika school considered the following as the only proper means of knowledge:

Perception (Pratyakṣa)
Inference (Anumāna)

Sankhya, Yoga, Vishishtadvaita Vedanta, and Dvaita Vedanta schools
According to the Sankhya, Yoga, and two sub-schools of Vedanta, the proper means of knowledge must rely on these three pramanas:

Pratyakṣa — perception
Anumāna — inference
Śabda — testimony/word of reliable experts

These are enumerated in sutra I.7 of the Yoga Sutras.  The mode of Pramana itself in sutra I.6 is distinguished among 5 classes of vritti/mental modification, the others including indiscrimination, verbal delusion, sleep, and memory.

Nyaya school
The Nyāya school accepts four means of obtaining knowledge (pramāṇa), viz., Perception, Inference, Comparison and Word.

Perception, called Pratyakṣa, occupies the foremost position in the Nyaya epistemology. Perception is defined by sense-object contact and is unerring. Perception can be of two types - ordinary or extraordinary. Ordinary (Laukika or Sādhārana) perception is of six types, viz., visual-by eyes, olfactory-by nose, auditory-by ears, tactile-by skin, gustatory-by tongue and mental-by mind. Extraordinary (Alaukika or Asādhārana) perception is of three types, viz., Sāmānyalakṣana (perceiving generality from a particular object), Jñānalakṣana (when one sense organ can also perceive qualities not attributable to it, as when seeing a chilli, one knows that it would be bitter or hot), and Yogaja (when certain human beings, from the power of Yoga, can perceive past, present and future and have supernatural abilities, either complete or some). Also, there are two modes or steps in perception, viz., Nirvikalpa, when one just perceives an object without being able to know its features, and Savikalpa, when one is able to clearly know an object. All laukika and alaukika pratyakshas are savikalpa. There is yet another stage called Pratyabhijñā, when one is able to re-recognise something on the basis of memory.
Inference, called Anumāna, is one of the most important contributions of Nyaya. It can be of two types – inference for oneself (Svārthānumāna, where one does not need any formal procedure, and at the most the last three of their 5 steps), and inference for others (Parāthānumāna, which requires a systematic methodology of 5 steps). Inference can also be classified into 3 types: Pūrvavat (inferring an unperceived effect from a perceived cause), Śeṣavat (inferring an unperceived cause from a perceived effect) and Sāmānyatodṛṣṭa (when inference is not based on causation but on uniformity of co-existence). A detailed analysis of error is also given, explaining when anumāna could be false.
Comparison, called Upamāna. It is produced by the knowledge of resemblance or similarity, given some pre-description of the new object beforehand.
Word, or Śabda are also accepted as a pramāṇa. It can be of two types, Vaidika (Vedic), which are the words of the four sacred Vedas, or can be more broadly interpreted as knowledge from sources acknowledged as authoritative, and Laukika, or words and writings of trustworthy human beings.

Prabhakara Mimamsa school
In Mimamsa school of Hinduism linked to Prabhakara considered the following pramanas as proper:
 Pratyakṣa (perception)
 Anumāṇa (inference)
 Śabda (word, testimony)
 Upamāṇa (comparison, analogy)
 Arthapatti (postulation, presumption)

Advaita Vedanta and Bhatta Mimamsa schools
In Advaita Vedānta, and Mimamsa school linked to Kumārila Bhaṭṭa, the following pramanas are accepted:
 Śabda (word, testimony)
 Pratyakṣa (perception)
 Anumāṇa (inference)
 Upamāṇa (comparison, analogy)
 Arthāpatti (postulation, presumption)
 Anupalabdi, Abhava (non-perception, cognitive proof using non-existence)

Buddhism

Padmākara Translation Group (2005: p. 390) annotates that:
Strictly speaking, pramana (tshad ma) means "valid cognition." In (Buddhism) practice, it refers to the tradition, principally associated with Dignāga and Dharmakīrti, of logic (rtags rigs) and epistemology (blo rigs).

Buddhism accepts only two pramana (tshad ma) as valid means to knowledge: Pratyaksha (mngon sum tshad ma, perception) and Anumāṇa (rjes dpag tshad ma, inference). Rinbochay adds that Buddhism also considers scriptures as third valid pramana, such as from Buddha and other "valid minds" and "valid persons". This third source of valid knowledge is a form of perception and inference in Buddhist thought. Valid scriptures, valid minds and valid persons are considered in Buddhism as Avisamvadin (mi slu ba, incontrovertible, indisputable). Means of cognition and knowledge, other than perception and inference, are considered invalid in Buddhism.

In Buddhism, the two most important scholars of pramāṇa are Dignāga and Dharmakīrti.

Sautrantrika
Dignāga and Dharmakīrti are usually categorized as expounding the view of the Sautrāntika tenets, though one can make a distinction between the Sautrāntikas Following Scripture (Tibetan: ལུང་གི་རྗེས་འབྲང་གི་མདོ་སྡེ་པ Wylie: lung gi rjes 'brang gi mdo sde pa) and the Sautrāntikas Following Reason (Tibetan: རིགས་པ་རྗེས་འབྲང་གི་མདོ་སྡེ་པ Wylie: rigs pa rjes 'brang gi mdo sde pa) and both these masters are described as establishing the latter. Dignāga's main text on this topic is the Pramāṇa-samuccaya.

These two rejected the complex Abhidharma-based description of how in the Vaibhāṣika school and the Sautrāntika Following Scripture approach connected an external world with mental objects, and instead posited that the mental domain never connects directly with the external world but instead only perceives an aspect based upon the sense organs and the sense consciousnesses. Further, the sense consciousnesses assume the form of the aspect (Sanskrit: Sākāravāda) of the external object and what is perceived is actually the sense consciousness which has taken on the form of the external object. By starting with aspects, a logical argument about the external world as discussed by the Hindu schools was possible. Otherwise their views would be so different as to be impossible to begin a debate. Then a logical discussion could follow.

This approach attempts to solve how the material world connects with the mental world, but not completely explaining it. When pushed on this point, Dharmakīrti then drops a presupposition of the Sautrāntrika position and shifts to a kind of Yogācāra position that extramental objects never really occur but arise from the habitual tendencies of mind. So he begins a debate with Hindu schools positing external objects then later to migrate the discussion to how that is logically untenable.

Note there are two differing interpretations of Dharmakīrti's approach later in Tibet, due to differing translations and interpretations. One is held by the Gelug school leaning to a moderate realism with some accommodation of universals and the other held by the other schools who held that Dharmakīrti was distinctly antirealist.

Apoha
A key feature of Dignāga's logic is in how he treats generalities versus specific objects of knowledge. The Nyāya Hindu school made assertions about the existence of general principles, and in refutation Dignāga asserted that generalities were mere mental features and not truly existent. To do this he introduced the idea of Apoha, that the way the mind recognizes is by comparing and negating known objects from the perception. In that way, the general idea or categories of objects has to do with differences from known objects, not from identification with universal truths. So one knows that a perceived chariot is a chariot not because it is in accord with a universal form of a chariot, but because it is perceived as different from things that are not chariots. This approach became an essential feature of Buddhist epistemology.

Madhyamaka
The contemporary of Dignāga but before Dharmakīrti, Bhāvaviveka, incorporated a logical approach when commenting upon Nāgārjuna. He also started with a Sautrāntika approach when discussing the way appearances appear, to debate with realists, but then took a Middle Way view of the ultimate nature of phenomenon. But he used logical assertions and arguments about the nature of that ultimate nature.

His incorporation of logic into the Middle Way system was later critiqued by Candrakīrti, who felt that the establishment of the ultimate way of abiding since it was beyond thought and concept was not the domain of logic. He used simple logical consequence arguments to refute the views of other tenet systems, but generally he thought a more developed use of logic and epistemology in describing the Middle Way was problematic. Bhāvaviveka's use of autonomous logical arguments was later described as the Svātantrika approach.

In Tibet
Modern Buddhist schools employ the 'three spheres' (Sanskrit: trimaṇḍala; Tibetan: 'khor gsum): 
subject
object, and
action.

When Madhyamaka first migrated to Tibet, Śāntarakṣita established a view of Madhyamaka more consistent with Bhāvaviveka while further evolving logical assertions as a way of contemplating and developing one's viewpoint of the ultimate truth.

In the 14th Century Je Tsongkhapa presented a new commentary and approach to Madhyamaka, which became the normative form in Tibet. In this variant, the Madhyamaka approach of Candrakīrti was elevated instead of Bhāvaviveka's yet Tsongkhapa rejected Candrakirti's disdain of logic and instead incorporated logic further.

The exact role of logic in Tibetan Buddhist practice and study may still be a topic of debate, but it is definitely established in the tradition. Ju Mipham remarked in his 19th century commentary on Śāntarakṣita's Madhyamakālaṅkāra:

See also

Hindu philosophy
Śāstra pramāṇam in Hinduism
Nyaya
Buddhist logic
Epistemology
Metaphysics

Notes

References

Sources

Bibliography
Śāntarakṣita (author); Mipham (commentator); Padmākara Translation Group (translators)(2005). The Adornment of the Middle Way: Shantarakshita's Madhyamakalankara with commentary by Jamgön Mipham. Boston, Massachusetts, USA: Shambhala Publications, Inc.  (alk. paper)

External links
Pramāṇamīmāṃsā: Devanagari, A SARIT Initiative, German Research Foundation
Pramāṇavārttika Pariśiṣṭa 1: Devanagari, A SARIT Initiative, German Research Foundation
Pramāṇavārttika: Devanagari, A SARIT Initiative, German Research Foundation
Pramāṇavārttikasvavṛttiṭīkā: Devanagari, A SARIT Initiative, German Research Foundation
Pramāṇavārttikālaṅkāra: Devanagari, A SARIT Initiative, German Research Foundation
Pramāṇāntarbhāva: Devanagari, A SARIT Initiative, German Research Foundation
Vidhabhusana, Satis Chandra (1907). History of the Mediaeval School of Indian Logic. Calcutta University.

Sources of knowledge
Concepts in epistemology
Hindu philosophical concepts
Buddhist logic
Epistemology literature